Kenta Tateyama (born December 26, 1990) is a Japanese former professional basketball player who last played for the Saitama Broncos of the B3 League in Japan. He was referred as a genius by Akita's former head coach Kazuo Nakamura.

Stephen Curry Asia Tour 2018
In a three-on-three exhibition, he competed against "Team Curry" in Shibuya, Tokyo on September 11, 2018.

Career statistics

Regular season 

|-
| align="left" | 2012-13
| align="left" | Akita
| 8 || 1 || 6.2 || 25.0 || 26.3 || 75.0 || 0.4 || 0.2 || 0.2 || 0.0 || 2.2
|-
| align="left" | 2013-14
| align="left" | Akita
| 25 || 2 || 3.5 || 26.3 || 20.7 || 50.0 || 0.3 || 0.2 || 0.1 || 0.0 ||  1.2
|-
| align="left" | 2014-15
| align="left" | Akita
| 49 || 1 || 7.3 || 45.3 || 36.8 || 68.4 || 0.9 || 0.3 || 0.1 || 0.1 || 3.8
|-
| align="left" | 2015-16
| align="left" | Akita
| 25 || 0 || 6.6 || 31.7 || 21.2 || 100 || 1.2 || 0.7 || 0.2 || 0.0 ||  2.1
|-
| align="left" | 2016-17
| align="left" | Aomori
| 50 || 49||23.6  ||46.2  || 37.0||76.1  || 2.6 || 1.9 || 0.5 ||0.6  || 8.2
|-
| align="left" | 2017-18
| align="left" | Kagoshima
|58  ||50  ||22.9  ||43.2 ||style="background-color:#CFECEC;| 37.8(RS 42.1) || 70.0 || 2.8 ||3.0  ||0.7 ||0.4  ||8.7
|-
| align="left" | 2018-19
| align="left" | Kagoshima
|54 ||35 ||19.1  ||39.0  ||style="background-color:#CFECEC;| 38.2(RS43.41) || 66.7 ||1.8 ||2.5  ||0.4 ||0.3  ||7.4
|-
| align="left" | 2019-20
| align="left" | Hachioji
|25 ||0 ||17.5  ||44.4  || 41.0 || 52.6||2.2 ||1.4  ||0.4 ||0.2  ||7.1
|-
| align="left" | 2019-20
| align="left" | Saitama
|10 ||0 ||19.0  ||37.5  || 40.0 || 50.0||1.4 ||2.0  ||0.4 ||0.3  ||4.3
|-

Playoffs 

|-
|style="text-align:left;"|2013-14
|style="text-align:left;"|Akita
| 5 || 0 ||5.80 || .500   || .333 || .667 ||0.8 ||0.0 || 0.2|| 0 ||2.2
|-

Trivia

He is so fond of fishing.

External links
 High school video

References

1990 births
Living people
Akita Northern Happinets players
Aomori Wat's players
Japanese men's basketball players
Kagoshima Rebnise players
People from Akita (city)
Saitama Broncos players
Senshu University alumni
Sportspeople from Akita Prefecture
Tokyo Hachioji Bee Trains players
Small forwards